Bullfinch is a small town in the eastern Wheatbelt region of Western Australia.

The town was gazetted in 1910. Gold mining is its largest industry.

Gold was first discovered in the area in December 1909 by prospector Charley Jones. The Bullfinch No 1, 2 and 3 were the first leases claimed. The Bullfinch mine closed in 1921, but other mines opened during a boom following World War II.

In 1932 the Wheat Pool of Western Australia announced that the town would have two grain elevators, each fitted with an engine, installed at the railway siding.

References 

Grain receival points of Western Australia
Mining towns in Western Australia
Shire of Yilgarn